Qualifier 4 of the Qualifying Round of the 2017 World Baseball Classic was held at MCU Park, Brooklyn, New York, United States from September 22 to 25, 2016. It was won by Team Israel, which went on to play in the World Baseball Classic in March 2017.

Qualifier 4 was a modified double-elimination tournament. The winners of the first games, Israel and Brazil, matched up in the second game, which Israel won.  Meanwhile, the losers, Great Britain and Pakistan, faced each other in an elimination game, which Great Britain won.

The winners of the elimination game, Great Britain, then played and defeated the losers of the non-elimination game, Brazil, in another elimination game.

Israel then defeated Great Britain 9–1 in the final on September 25, 2016, to determine the winners of the Qualifier 4. Team Israel next played in South Korea in March 2017, as the 16th and final team in the WBC. They swept Pool B, beating South Korea, Taiwan, and the Netherlands, to qualify for the second round.

Bracket

Results
All times are Eastern Daylight Time (UTC−04:00).

Brazil 10, Pakistan 0

Israel 5, Great Britain 2

Israel 1, Brazil 0

Great Britain 14, Pakistan 0

Great Britain 4, Brazil 3

Israel 9, Great Britain 1

External links
Official website

Qualifier 4
World Baseball Classic – Qualifier 4
2010s in Brooklyn
International baseball competitions hosted by the United States
International sports competitions in New York (state)
World Baseball Classic – Qualifier 4
Baseball competitions in New York City
Sports in Brooklyn